Gyantse County officially Gyangzê County is a county of Xigazê in  the Tibet Autonomous Region. Its main settlement is Gyantse Town known for its monasteries.

Town and townships
1 town and 18 townships:

 Gyangzê (Gyantse) Town
 Naröl Township
 Kardoi Township
 Karmai Township
 Tsangkha Township
 Rinang Township
 Dagzê Township
 Rasog Township
 Drongtsé Township
 Lungmar Township
 Tsechen Township
 Jangra Township
 Nyangdoi Township
 Kangco Township
 Gyinkar Township
 Rizhing Township
 Ralung Township
 Charing Township
 Jaggyê Township

Climate

References

 
Counties of Tibet
Shigatse

pl:Gyangzê